Channel capacity, in electrical engineering, computer science, and information theory, is the tight upper bound on the rate at which information can be reliably transmitted over a communication channel.

Following the terms of the noisy-channel coding theorem, the channel capacity of a given channel is the highest information rate (in units of information per unit time) that can be achieved with arbitrarily small error probability. 

Information theory, developed by Claude E. Shannon in 1948, defines the notion of channel capacity and provides a mathematical model by which it may be computed. The key result states that the capacity of the channel, as defined above, is given by the maximum of the mutual information between the input and output of the channel, where the maximization is with respect to the input distribution. 

The notion of channel capacity has been central to the development of modern wireline and wireless communication systems, with the advent of novel error correction coding mechanisms that have resulted in achieving performance very close to the limits promised by channel capacity.

Formal definition 

The basic mathematical model for a communication system is the following:

where:
  is the message to be transmitted;
  is the channel input symbol ( is a sequence of  symbols) taken in an  alphabet ;
  is the channel output symbol ( is a sequence of  symbols) taken in an alphabet ;
  is the estimate of the transmitted message;
  is the encoding function for a block of length ;
  is the noisy channel, which is modeled by a conditional probability distribution; and,
  is the decoding function for a block of length .

Let  and  be modeled as random variables. Furthermore, let  be the conditional probability distribution function of  given , which is an inherent fixed property of the communication channel. Then the choice of the marginal distribution  completely determines the joint distribution  due to the identity

which, in turn, induces a mutual information . The channel capacity is defined as

Additivity of channel capacity 
Channel capacity is additive over independent channels. It means that using two independent channels in a combined manner provides the same theoretical  capacity as using them independently. 
More formally, let  and  be two independent channels modelled as above;  having an input alphabet  and an output alphabet .
We define the product channel  as 

This theorem states:

Shannon capacity of a graph

If G is an undirected graph, it can be used to define a communications channel in which the symbols are the graph vertices, and two codewords may be confused with each other if their symbols in each position are equal or adjacent. The computational complexity of finding the Shannon capacity of such a channel remains open, but it can be upper bounded by another important graph invariant, the Lovász number.

Noisy-channel coding theorem

The noisy-channel coding theorem states that for any error probability ε > 0 and for any transmission rate R less than the channel capacity C, there is an encoding and decoding scheme transmitting data at rate R whose error probability is less than ε, for a sufficiently large block length. Also, for any rate greater than the channel capacity, the probability of error at the receiver goes to 0.5 as the block length goes to infinity.

Example application

An application of the channel capacity concept to an additive white Gaussian noise (AWGN) channel with B Hz bandwidth and signal-to-noise ratio S/N is the Shannon–Hartley theorem:

C is measured in bits per second if the logarithm is taken in base 2, or nats per second if the natural logarithm is used, assuming B is in hertz; the signal and noise powers S and N are expressed in a linear power unit (like watts or volts2). Since S/N figures are often cited in dB, a conversion may be needed.

Channel capacity in wireless communications 

This section focuses on the single-antenna, point-to-point scenario. For channel capacity in systems with multiple antennas, see the article on MIMO.

Bandlimited AWGN channel

 [bits/s],

where  is the received signal-to-noise ratio (SNR). This result is known as the Shannon–Hartley theorem.

When the SNR is large (SNR ≫ 0 dB), the capacity  is logarithmic in power and approximately linear in bandwidth. This is called the bandwidth-limited regime.

When the SNR is small (SNR ≪ 0 dB), the capacity  is linear in power but insensitive to bandwidth. This is called the power-limited regime.

The bandwidth-limited regime and power-limited regime are illustrated in the figure.

Frequency-selective AWGN channel

The capacity of the frequency-selective channel is given by so-called water filling power allocation,

Slow-fading channel

In a slow-fading channel, where the coherence time is greater than the latency requirement, there is no definite capacity as the maximum rate of reliable communications supported by the channel, depends on the random channel gain , which is unknown to the transmitter. If the transmitter encodes data at rate  [bits/s/Hz], there is a non-zero probability that the decoding error probability cannot be made arbitrarily small,

,

in which case the system is said to be in outage. With a non-zero probability that the channel is in deep fade, the capacity of the slow-fading channel in strict sense is zero. This value is known as the -outage capacity.

Fast-fading channel

In a fast-fading channel, where the latency requirement is greater than the coherence time and the codeword length spans many coherence periods, one can average over many independent channel fades by coding over a large number of coherence time intervals. Thus, it is possible to achieve a reliable rate of communication of  [bits/s/Hz] and it is meaningful to speak of this value as the capacity of the fast-fading channel.

See also

 Bandwidth (computing)
 Bandwidth (signal processing)
 Bit rate 
 Code rate
 Error exponent
 Nyquist rate
 Negentropy
 Redundancy
 Sender, Data compression, Receiver
 Shannon–Hartley theorem
 Spectral efficiency
 Throughput

Advanced Communication Topics
 MIMO
 Cooperative diversity

External links
 
 AWGN Channel Capacity with various constraints on the channel input (interactive demonstration)

References

Information theory
Telecommunication theory
Television terminology